Joseph Adelard Edmond Bouchard (May 24, 1892 in Saint-Étienne-des-Grès, Quebec – July 18, 1955) was a Canadian ice hockey left winger who sometimes doubled as a defenceman. He played eight seasons in the National Hockey League with the Hamilton Tigers, New York Americans, Pittsburgh Pirates, and Montreal Canadiens. He also spent several years playing in various minor leagues throughout his career, which lasted from 1915 to 1932.

Career statistics

Regular season and playoffs

References

External links

1892 births
1955 deaths
Canadian ice hockey left wingers
French Quebecers
Hamilton Tigers (ice hockey) players
Ice hockey people from Quebec
Montreal Canadiens players
New York Americans players
People from Mauricie
Pittsburgh Pirates (NHL) players
Pittsburgh Yellow Jackets (IHL) players